"U.N.C.O.U.P.L.E.D." is a popular song from the musical Starlight Express, with music by Andrew Lloyd Webber and lyrics by Richard Stilgoe. It is performed by Dinah the Dining Car, after being dumped by her macho boyfriend, Greaseball.  It is a pastiche of the Tammy Wynette song, "D-I-V-O-R-C-E."

Lyrics
The lyrics are packed with humour. The song starts with Dinah describing to her friends that "I've been..." before confessing that she "can't say the word." So she spells it out for them instead. She then goes on to explain how she can't stop "C.R.Y.I.N.G." She announces that she will have her "R.E.V.E.N.G.E." on Greaseball, who she now sees as a complete "B.A.S.T.A.R.D."

Music
Andrew Lloyd Webber wrote the song in the key of B flat major. It is played in a country and western style.

Thematic value
The song is reprised when Greaseball can't find the word to apologise to Dinah. She recommends he spell it instead, so (being a bit of a dunce) he tells her he is "S.O.R.R.R.Y."

History
Starlight Express has had many revisions made to the costumes, make-up, choreography, wigs, set, characters and musical numbers. Of all the notable musical numbers in Starlight Express, U.N.C.O.U.P.L.E.D (along with 'Right Place, Right Time') has had no revision made to the number at all.

Recordings
Starlight Express: Original London Cast Recording - Frances Ruffelle
The New Starlight Express - Caron Cardelle
Crimson Ensemble
Stephanie Lawrence
The London Pops Orchestra
Diane Langton

References
Starlight Express

Songs from musicals
Songs with music by Andrew Lloyd Webber
1984 songs